The Ralfes Creek, a perennial stream that is part of the Hastings River catchment, is located in the Mid North Coast region of New South Wales, Australia.

Course and features
The river flows generally southeast, northeast, southeast, and then north northeast before reaching its confluence with the Hastings River west of the locality of Ellenborough. The river descends  over its  course.

The Oxley Highway transverses the river near its confluence with the Hastings River.

See also

 Rivers of New South Wales
 List of rivers of New South Wales (L-Z)
 List of rivers of Australia

References

External links
 

 

Rivers of New South Wales
Mid North Coast